Fernando Arroyo (born March 21, 1952) is an American former professional baseball pitcher for the Detroit Tigers, Minnesota Twins, and Oakland Athletics of Major League Baseball (MLB). In eight MLB seasons, he had a 24–37 record over 121 games (60 started), with 12 complete games, two shutouts, 28 games finished, 535 innings pitched, 589 hits allowed, 288 runs allowed, 264 earned runs allowed, 56 home runs allowed, 160 walks allowed, 172 strikeouts, 11 hit batsmen, 15 wild pitches, 2,289 batters faced, 13 intentional walks, four balks and a 4.44 ERA.

On March 13, 2010, Arroyo was inducted into the Mexican American Hall of Fame in a ceremony held at the Jose Rizal Community Center in Sacramento, California.

References

External links

1952 births
Living people
American baseball players of Mexican descent
American expatriate baseball players in Canada
American expatriate baseball players in Mexico
Baseball players from Sacramento, California
Bristol Tigers players
Denver Bears players
Denver Zephyrs players
Detroit Tigers players
Diablos Rojos del México players
Edmonton Trappers players
Evansville Triplets players
Lakeland Tigers players
Leones de Yucatán players
Major League Baseball pitchers
Mexican League baseball pitchers
Minnesota Twins players
Modesto A's players
Montgomery Rebels players
Oakland Athletics players
San Jose Bees players
Tacoma Tigers players
Toledo Mud Hens players